is a Japanese anthology manga series written and illustrated by Toranosuke Shimada. It was serialized in Kodansha's seinen manga magazine Monthly Morning Two from July 2018 to June 2019, with its chapters collected in two wideban volumes.

Publication
It was serialized in Kodansha's seinen manga magazine Monthly Morning Two from July 21, 2018 to June 22, 2019. Kodansha collected its chapters in two wideban volumes, both released on August 23, 2019.

In North America, Seven Seas Entertainment announced in May 2021 that they had licensed the series in English and published it in an omnibus edition on December 7, 2021. The manga is also licensed in France by Noeve Grafx.

Volume list

ReceptionRobo Sapiens ranked #2 on Takarajimasha's Kono Manga ga Sugoi! list of best manga of 2020 for male readers. In December 2019, Brutus magazine listed Robo Sapiens on their "Most Dangerous Manga" list, which included works with the most "stimulating" and thought-provoking themes. It was nominated for the 24th Tezuka Osamu Cultural Prize in 2020. Robo Sapiens won the Manga Division's Grand Prize of the 23rd Japan Media Arts Festival Awards in 2020. The manga was nominated for the 51st Seiun Awards in the comic category in 2020. The School Library Journal listed the first volume of Robo Sapiens'' as one of the top 10 manga of 2021. The series was nominated for the Eisner Award for Best U.S. Edition of International Material—Asia in 2022.

References

Further reading

External links
 

Kodansha manga
Manga anthologies
Science fiction anime and manga
Seinen manga
Seven Seas Entertainment titles